Seventeen is a lost 1916 American comedy silent film directed by Robert G. Vignola and written by Booth Tarkington and Harvey F. Thew. It is based on Tarkington's novel of the same name which was published earlier the same year. The film stars Louise Huff, Jack Pickford, Winifred Allen, Madge Evans, Walter Hiers, and Dick Lee. The film was released on November 2, 1916 by Paramount Pictures.

Plot

Cast 

Louise Huff as Lola Pratt
Jack Pickford as William Sylvanus Baxter
Winifred Allen as May Parcher
Madge Evans as Jane Baxter
Walter Hiers as George Cooper
Dick Lee as Genesis
Richard Rosson as Johnny Watson
Julian Dillon as Joe Bullit
Helen Lindroth as Mrs. Baxter
Tony Merlo as Mr. Baxter
Rudolph Valentino (uncredited)

References

External links 
 
 

1916 films
1910s English-language films
Silent American comedy films
1916 comedy films
Paramount Pictures films
Lost American films
Films based on works by Booth Tarkington
Films directed by Robert G. Vignola
American black-and-white films
American silent feature films
1916 lost films
Lost comedy films
1910s American films